Madunnella is a 1948 Italian melodrama film directed by Ernesto Grassi and starring Edmea Lari, Aldo Bufi Landi and Rino Genovese.

Plot
A respectable clerk from Naples becomes mixed up in embezzlement and smuggling in order to pay for his daughter's wedding.

Cast
 Edmea Lari as Maria, detta 'a Madunnella'  
 Aldo Bufi Landi as Mario  
 Rino Genovese as Michele il contrabbandiere  
 Ugo D'Alessio as Il ragionere, padre di Maria 
 Vittoria Crispo 
 Giovanni Berardi  
 Alberto Amato
 Natale Montillo

References

Bibliography
 Caldiron, Orio. La bella compagnia. Bulzoni, 2009.

External links

1948 films
1948 drama films
1940s Italian-language films
Italian drama films
Films set in Naples
Italian black-and-white films
Melodrama films
1940s Italian films